The Shirehall is a building on St Peter's Square, Hereford, England. It has been designated by English Heritage as a grade II* listed building.

History
An Act of Parliament in 1815 allowed for "erecting a Shire Hall, Courts of Justice and other Buildings, for Public Purposes; and for providing suitable Accommodations for His Majesty's Justices of Assize, in and for the County of Hereford". The Shirehall, which was designed by Charles Heather under the instruction of Sir Robert Smirke in the Classical style, was completed in 1817. The design involved a symmetrical main frontage facing onto St Peter's Square; the central section featured a hexastyle portico with Doric order columns supporting a frieze with triglyphs and a pediment. The principal rooms included a Great Hall, a Grand Jury Room, a library and some courtrooms. A statue of the former Chancellor of the Exchequer, Sir George Cornewall Lewis, by Carlo Marochetti was unveiled outside the Shirehall in 1864.

Although originally used as a facility for dispensing justice, following the implementation of the Local Government Act 1888, which established county councils in every county, it also became the meeting place of Herefordshire County Council. In a celebrated case at the time, a solicitor, Herbert Armstrong, was tried and convicted of murdering his wife, in April 1922.

After the Herefordshire County Council was abolished in 1974, the new authority, Hereford and Worcester County Council was initially based at the Shire Hall in Worcester but moved its base to County Hall in Worcester in 1978. However with the creation of the unitary authority known as Herefordshire Council in 1998, meetings of the new body with county-wide responsibilities were once again being held at the Shirehall in Hereford.

Some council staff relocated from the council's former base at Brockington to the Shirehall in August 2014, so allowing the Shirehall to form part of the "civic hub", along with Hereford Town Hall. A plaque was unveiled by the Lord Lieutenant of Herefordshire, Susan Bligh, Countess of Darnley, to commemorate the 200th anniversary of the opening of the Shirehall, in October 2017.

The building, which continued to host Crown Court hearings, suffered a ceiling collapse in one of the courtrooms in June 2020; the incident happened on a Sunday when the building was unoccupied and so no staff or members of the public were injured.

See also
 Grade II* listed buildings in Herefordshire

References

Grade II* listed buildings in Herefordshire
Buildings and structures in Herefordshire
1817 establishments in England
H
Government buildings completed in 1817